Congo competed at the 2012 Summer Olympics in London, United Kingdom from 27 July to 12 August 2012. This was the nation's eleventh appearance at the Olympics, excluding the 1968 Summer Olympics in Mexico City, and the 1976 Summer Olympics in Montreal because of the African boycott.

Comité National Olympique et Sportif Congolais sent the nation's largest delegation after the 1992 Summer Olympics in Barcelona. 7 athletes, 4 men and 3 women, were selected to the team, participating only in athletics, swimming, and table tennis. Among the athletes, swimmer Emile Bakale and table tennis player Suraju Saka  competed only at their second consecutive Olympics. Sprinter Lorene Bazolo, on the other hand, was the nation's flag bearer at the opening ceremony. Congo, however, has yet to win its first Olympic medal.

Athletics

Men

Women

Key
Note–Ranks given for track events are within the athlete's heat only
Q = Qualified for the next round
q = Qualified for the next round as a fastest loser or, in field events, by position without achieving the qualifying target
NR = National record
N/A = Round not applicable for the event
Bye = Athlete not required to compete in round

Swimming

Congo has gained two "Universality places" from the FINA.

Men

Women

Table tennis

Congo has qualified three athletes.

References

External links
 
 

Nations at the 2012 Summer Olympics
2012
Olympics